Gryllus lineaticeps, the variable field cricket, is a species of cricket in the subfamily Gryllinae. It is found in North America.

References

Further reading

 
 

lineaticeps
Insects described in 1861